Animal Aid Unlimited or AAU, founded in 2002, is an Indian animal rescue organization, based in Udaipur city of Rajasthan which rescues and treats animals that are sick, injured, stuck or in need of urgent medical aid and attention. They gained more popularity worldwide after they started posting videos of their rescue on their YouTube channel, Animal Aid Unlimited, India.

As of January 2022, their YouTube channel has over 7.3 million subscribers. Some of the most viral videos of the channel are "Wounded and bleeding donkey stranded on highway rescued", "A drowning dog's desperate wish comes true" and "Stuck for hours in rock solid tar, puppies rescued" all of which have 144, 78 and 46 million views respectively.

History 
Animal Aid Unlimited was founded in 2002 by Erika, Jim and Claire Abrams Myers, originally hailing from Seattle in the United States. They opened the Animal Aid Hospital in 2003. As of 2020, there is a 100 member staff which works towards the rescue, welfare and treatment of various animals in and around the city of Udaipur, Rajasthan.

AAU had organized a 14-day animal rescue and volunteering programme, in which many other animal rescue organizations participated including Action for Animals.

As of 2017, the organization claims to have saved more than 45,000 injured or ill dogs, cows, donkeys, birds and cats.

In 2021, Gary Notely who is a dog training instructor had hosted a charity event at Zara Indian Restaurant in Woodham Mortimer.

See also 
 Humane Society International
 Blue Cross of India

References

External links 
 Official website
Official YouTube channel of Animal Aid Unlimited
Official Facebook page

Animal welfare organisations based in India
Organizations established in 2002
Non-profit organisations based in India
Organisations based in Rajasthan
2002 establishments in India
Volunteer organisations in India
Animal rescue groups
Dog welfare organizations